Downeshelea is a genus of predaceous midges in the family Ceratopogonidae. There are more than 20 described species in Downeshelea.

Species
These 27 species belong to the genus Downeshelea:

 Downeshelea bicornis Felippe-Bauer & Quintelas, 1993
 Downeshelea bimaculata Clastrier & Delecolle, 1990
 Downeshelea blantoni Lane & Wirth
 Downeshelea cebacoi Lane & Wirth
 Downeshelea charrua Felippe-Bauer & Spinelli, 1994
 Downeshelea chiapasi Lane & Wirth
 Downeshelea chirusi Lane & Wirth
 Downeshelea colombiae Lane & Wirth
 Downeshelea deanei Felippe-Bauer & Quintelas, 1995
 Downeshelea fluminensis Felippe-Bauer & Quintelas, 1993
 Downeshelea fuscipennis Lane & Wirth
 Downeshelea grogani
 Downeshelea lanei Felippe-Bauer & Borkent
 Downeshelea leei (Debenham, 1972)
 Downeshelea macclurei Ratanaworabhan & Wirth
 Downeshelea mcdanieli (Tokunaga, 1959)
 Downeshelea multilineata (Lutz, 1914)
 Downeshelea nigra (Tokunaga, 1963)
 Downeshelea panamensis Lane & Wirth
 Downeshelea quasidentica Felippe-Bauer & Quintelas, 1993
 Downeshelea scanloni Ratanaworabhan & Wirth
 Downeshelea sepikensis (Debenham, 1972)
 Downeshelea stenochora Wirth & Giles, 1990
 Downeshelea stonei Wirth, 1953
 Downeshelea unimaculata (Debenham, 1972)
 Downeshelea whartoni Ratanaworabhan & Wirth
 Downeshelea xanthogonua (Tokunaga, 1963)

References

Further reading

 
 
 

Ceratopogonidae
Articles created by Qbugbot
Chironomoidea genera